Rikke Læntver Sevecke (born 15 June 1996) is a Danish professional footballer who plays as a defender for Everton in the  FA WSL. In 2016, she won her first cap for the senior Denmark national team.

Club career

Nykøbing Falster-born Sevecke began playing football as a three-year-old. She moved away from home to join Ballerup-Skovlunde Fodbold when she was 16 years old. After establishing herself as one of the best young defenders in the Elitedivisionen, she became Per Nielsen's first signing for Brøndby IF in January 2015.

In January 2018 Sevecke returned to Brøndby after a six-month spell playing college soccer for the University of Northwestern Ohio.

International career

Sevecke appeared 25 times for the Denmark women's national under-19 football team, including at the 2013 and 2015 editions of the UEFA Women's Under-19 Championship. She made her senior international debut for Denmark at the 2016 Algarve Cup, in a 4–1 defeat by Iceland.

International goals

Awards

Individual
 WHAC Newcomer of the Year: 2017
 NAIA First Team All-American: 2017

References

External links
Profile at Danish Football Association 

Profile at University of Northwestern Ohio

1996 births
Living people
People from Guldborgsund Municipality
Danish women's footballers
Women's association football defenders
Brøndby IF (women) players
University of Northwestern Ohio alumni
College women's soccer players in the United States
Denmark women's international footballers
Danish expatriate women's footballers
Danish expatriate sportspeople in the United States
Expatriate women's soccer players in the United States
Ballerup-Skovlunde Fodbold (women) players
Women's Super League players
Danish expatriate sportspeople in France
Division 1 Féminine players
Expatriate women's footballers in France
Everton F.C. (women) players
Danish expatriate sportspeople in England
Expatriate women's footballers in England
FC Fleury 91 (women) players
Sportspeople from Region Zealand
UEFA Women's Euro 2022 players